Top Country Albums is a chart published weekly by Billboard magazine in the United States. The 50-position chart lists the most popular country music albums in the country, calculated weekly by Broadcast Data Systems based on physical sales along with digital sales and streaming. The chart was first published in the issue of Billboard dated January 11, 1964, under the title Hot Country Albums, when the number one album was Ring of Fire: The Best of Johnny Cash by Johnny Cash.

The chart changed its name to Top Country LP's in the issue of Billboard dated January 13, 1968, Top Country LPs (with no apostrophe) in the issue dated May 31, 1980, and Top Country Albums in the issue dated October 20, 1984. The record for the highest number of weeks spent at number one by an album is held by Dangerous: The Double Album by Morgan Wallen, which spent a total of 97 non-consecutive weeks atop the chart.

Methodology
From its launch until May 1991, the chart was compiled based on sales reports submitted by a representative sample of record stores nationwide.  In 1991 the sales reports were replaced by electronic point of sale data.  Since February 2017 the chart has been "based on multi-metric consumption (blending traditional album sales, track equivalent albums, and streaming equivalent albums)".

Chart records

Albums with most weeks at number one

The following albums have spent more than 30 weeks at number one, as of the chart dated March 18, 2023:

The figure for "Fearless" by Taylor Swift does not include the weeks spent at number one by Fearless (Taylor's Version), her 2021 complete re-recording of the album.  Dixie Chicks and Lady Antebellum subsequently changed their names to The Chicks and Lady A respectively.

Artist with most number ones
George Strait has achieved the most number ones, reaching the top spot with 27 albums.

Artists with most cumulative weeks at number one

The followings acts have achieved at least 50 weeks at number one, as of the chart dated March 18, 2023.

The total for The Chicks consists of 71 weeks under the band's previous name, Dixie Chicks, and 2 under its new name.

Artists with most consecutive number one albums
The following artists have garnered the most consecutive number one albums on the Top Country Albums chart.

See also
List of Billboard number-one country albums

References

External links
Current Top Country Albums chart

Billboard charts
American country music